The 1993–94 Copa Federación de España  was the first edition of the Copa Federación de España, a knockout competition for Spanish football clubs, since its reinstatement.

Competition

First round

|}

Quarterfinals

|}

Semi-finals

|}

Final

|}

References
Results at Eldeportivo.es

Copa Federación de España seasons
Fed
Copa